Hodoš (or) is a village in Slovenia. It is the seat of the Municipality of Hodoš. It is part of the Prekmurje region.

Name
Hodoš was first mentioned in written sources in 1331 as de Hudus-feu (and as Hodos in 1452 and 1453). The name is probably based on the hypocorism *Xodošь, from the Slavic personal name *Xodъ. A less likely possibility is that the name is derived from the Hungarian common  noun hód 'beaver'.

Mass graves
Hodoš is the site of two known mass graves associated with the Second World War and immediate postwar period. The Cold Valley Mass Grave is located in the woods northwest of Hodoš, southwest of a small lake, in a ravine known as the Cold Valley. It contains the remains of seven or eight ethnic Hungarians (or possibly German soldiers) that were killed when the Red Army arrived in April 1945. It contains the remains of a group of Hungarians that illegally crossed the border in 1945. They were shot and their bodies were thrown into an abandoned well.

Notable people
Notable people that were born or lived in Hodoš include:
Jurij Cipot (1794–1834), religious writer
Rudolf Cipot (1825–1901), religious writer
János Kardos (a.k.a. Janoš Kardoš) (1801–1875), Lutheran priest, teacher, and writer

References

External links

Hodoš on Geopedia
Hodoš municipal site

Populated places in the Municipality of Hodoš